The Scout and Guide movement in Kiribati is served by
 The Girl Guides Association of Kiribati, member of the World Association of Girl Guides and Girl Scouts
 Kiribati Scout Association, member of the World Organization of the Scout Movement

See also